Valiabad (also Romanized as Vālīābād) is a village in Soghan Rural District, Soghan District, Arzuiyeh County, Kerman Province, Iran. At the 2006 census, its population was 95, in 22 families.

References 

Populated places in Arzuiyeh County